Nabi may refer to:

People
Adil Nabi (born 1994), English footballer
Heiki Nabi (born 1985), Estonian wrestler
Isadore Nabi, satirical pseudonym of Richard Levins and Richard Lewontin, scientists in the 1960s
Mohammad Nabi (born 1985), Afghan cricketer
Samir Nabi (born 1997), English footballer
Yusuf Nabi (1642–1712), Turkish poet
Nabi Avcı (born 1953), Turkish academic and politician
Nabi Şensoy (1945–2018) Turkish diplomat
Nabi Tajima (1900–2018), Japanese supercentenarian and last living person born in the 19th century

Acronym
 Native American Bahá'í Institute, a Regional Bahá'í Training Institute in Burntwater, Arizona, United States
 North American Bus Industries, a bus manufacturing company based in Alabama, United States

Other uses
 Nabi (film), a 2001 South Korean film
 Nabi, Iran, a village in Khuzestan Province, Iran
 Typhoon Nabi, a 2005 super typhoon
 Prophets of Islam, humans who, in the Islamic faith, have been chosen as prophets by God
 The Korean-language title of Mr. Butterfly, a 2003 South Korean film
 An input method for UNIX platforms
 A character in the Korean animation There She Is!!
 A line of tablets manufactured by Fuhu

See also 
 Les Nabis, a group of Parisian artists in the 1890s 
 Navi (disambiguation)
 Nebi (disambiguation)

Arabic-language surnames
Turkish-language surnames
Turkish masculine given names